Moisés Torrealba (born January 5, 1978) is a Venezuelan musician.

Travel
He has toured in countries including Norway, France, London, Spain, Brazil, Curaçao and Colombia.

See also 
Bandola
Venezuelan music

External links
Torrealba´s biography

1978 births
Living people
Maracas players
People from Barinas (state)
Venezuelan bandola players
Venezuelan folk musicians